This is a list of Speakers of the Mpumalanga Provincial Legislature, until 1995 called the Eastern Transvaal Provincial Legislature.

References

Mpumalanga
Mpumalanga
Mpumalanga
Speakers of the Mpumalanga Provincial Legislature
Speakers of the Mpumalanga Provincial Legislature